Latin Lover is the fifth album by Gianna Nannini. It was released in 1982

It is the first album made in collaboration with the German producer Conny Plank, and features prominent guest musicians such as Annie Lennox, Jaki Liebezeit and Annette Humpe. It performed well all around Europe, eventually becoming Gold in Germany, Austria and Switzerland, and Platinum in Italy. It was also distributed in Israel, Mexico, Paraguay, South Korea, and North America. In October of the same year, Nannini performed at the Rockpalast Essen stage alongside Kid Creole & The Coconuts and Little Steven.
Two songs from the album, "Vieni Ragazzo" and "Come un Treno", were used by Michelangelo Antonioni for the soundtrack of his film "Identificazione di una donna".

Track listing
"Primadonna" (M. Paoluzzi - Gianna Nannini) – 3:47
"Wagon-Lits" (Gianna Nannini - M. Paoluzzi/Gianna Nannini) – 4:10
"Ragazzo Dell'Europa" (Gianna Nannini) – 3:34
"Latin Lover" (Gianna Nannini - M. Paoluzzi/Gianna Nannini) - 4:35
"Fumetto" (Gianna Nannini) – 3:30
"Carillon" (Gianna Nannini) – 4:05
"Amore Amore" (Gianna Nannini) – 4:13
"Volo 5/4" (Gianna Nannini) - 4:20

Personnel
Gianna Nannini – Vocals, piano, violin
Hans Bäär – Bass, keyboards
Rüdiger Braune – Drums
Conny Plank – Drums, programming
Rudy Spinello – Guitar
Jaki Liebezeit – Drums
Mauro Pagani – Mandoline, violin
Mauro Paoluzzi – Guitar
Annie Lennox – Piano
Annette Humpe – Piano
The Wolperats – Backing vocals
Production: Conny Plank, Gianna Nannini

Charts

Weekly charts

Year-end charts

References

External links
 Gianna Nannini homepage

1982 albums
Gianna Nannini albums
Albums produced by Conny Plank